Port Denison is a town of 3000 residents in the Mid West region of Western Australia.

History
Port Denison was initially known as Irwin Port in 1866 due to its position near the mouth of the Irwin River. However, when it was officially named and gazetted in 1867, it was renamed in honour of Sir William Denison, a former Governor of Tasmania who in 1851 had visited Western Australia in connection with transportation of convicts.

Economy
Port Denison is the home port of a number of commercial fishermen that catch lobster (known as crayfish locally).

References

External links

Towns in Western Australia
Shire of Irwin
Fishing communities in Australia